The Two Dianas is a historical novel published in 1846-47 under the name of Alexandre Dumas but mostly or entirely written by his friend and collaborator Paul Meurice. The "two Dianas" of the title are Diane de Poitiers (the mistress of Henry II) and her supposed daughter Diana de Castro. The novel's setting is earlier than Dumas's better known "Valois trilogy". The principal character is Gabriel, comte de Montgomery; other characters include Martin Guerre, Catherine de Médicis and Ambroise Paré. When Meurice later published a dramatisation of the novel, a letter supposedly written by Dumas was attached as a preface, stating that he had never even read the book and that Meurice was the real author. Nevertheless, it has been argued that Dumas was at least somewhat involved in its composition. According to F. W. J. Hemmings, The Two Dianas is "entirely lacking in Dumas's usual deftness of touch".

References

1846 French novels
Novels by Alexandre Dumas
Novels set in the 16th century
French historical novels